Nicholas James Mondek (born November 3, 1988) is a former American football offensive tackle. He was selected in the sixth round, 195th overall, by the Texans in the 2012 NFL Draft. He played college football at Purdue. While at Purdue he was recruited by Joe Tiller as a defensive tackle, but when Danny Hope took over the program in 2010, Hope transitioned Mondek into an offensive tackle.

College career

Mondek committed to Purdue University on November 17, 2006. Mondek was also receiving football scholarships from Central Michigan, Hawaii, Northern Illinois and Vanderbilt

References

External links
 Purdue Boilermakers bio

1988 births
Living people
American football offensive guards
American football offensive tackles
Houston Texans players
Purdue Boilermakers football players
Sportspeople from Naperville, Illinois
Players of American football from Illinois